The 1973 Bowling Green Falcons football team was an American football team that represented Bowling Green University in the Mid-American Conference (MAC) during the 1973 NCAA Division I football season. In their sixth season under head coach Don Nehlen, the Falcons compiled a 7–3 record (2–3 against MAC opponents), finished in a tie for third place in the MAC, and outscored their opponents by a combined total of 266 to 209.

The team's statistical leaders included Reid Lamport with 1,084 passing yards, Paul Miles with 1,030 rushing yards, and Roger Wallace with 587 receiving yards.

Schedule

Roster

References

Bowling Green
Bowling Green Falcons football seasons
Bowling Green Falcons football